Two Shall Be Born is a 1924 American silent drama film directed by Whitman Bennett and starring Jane Novak, Kenneth Harlan, and Sigrid Holmquist. It was written by Marie Conway Oemler who was inspired by the short story "Two Shall Be Born" by Susan Marr Spalding.

Synopsis
A Polish countess on a mission to promote world peace, arrives in New York where she receives assistance from a traffic policeman who helps her thwart attempts to foil her mission.

Cast

Preservation
With no prints of Two Shall Be Born located in any film archives, it is a lost film.

References

Bibliography
 Kris Van Heuckelom. Polish Migrants in European Film 1918–2017. Springer, 2019.

External links

1924 films
1924 drama films
Silent American drama films
Films directed by Whitman Bennett
American silent feature films
1920s English-language films
American black-and-white films
Vitagraph Studios films
1920s American films